Alexandria Regional Center for Women's Health and Development (formerly called The Suzanne Mubarak Regional Centre for Women's Health and Development) is a non-profit training and research center in Alexandria, Egypt. It is concerned with women's health and women's development in Egypt and its neighboring countries. The Centre was named after Suzanne Mubarak, wife of former Egyptian president Hosni Mubarak, who was interested in improving the physical and social well-being of women in Egypt.

Research
The Center also contains a digital library and specialized clinics. In 2007, it organized a conference on violence against women.

References

External links
Official Alexandria Regional Centre for Women's Health and Development website

Organisations based in Alexandria
Obstetrics and gynaecology organizations
Medical schools in Egypt
Non-profit organisations based in Egypt
Organizations with year of establishment missing